Jack Dunne is an Irish rugby union player who plays for Exeter Chiefs in England's Premiership Rugby. He previously played for Leinster. He plays as a lock and represented Dublin University in the All-Ireland League. Dunne studied theoretical physics in Trinity College, where he received both a rugby scholarship and the Naughton Scholarship for physics.

Underage rugby
Dunne attended St Michael's College, Dublin and entered the Leinster sub-academy immediately upon leaving school in 2017 before being promoted to the full academy in the Summer of 2018. He was selected for the Ireland U20s in the 2018 Six Nations Under 20s Championship and at the 2018 World Rugby Under 20 Championship. Captained the Seapoint U10s B team in 2008.

Professional career
Dunne was part of the Celtic Cup-winning Leinster 'A' side in 2018 and made his senior Leinster debut in February 2019 in a victory against Zebre. He signed his first professional contract with Leinster for the 2020/21 season 

Dunne was selected as an internationally uncapped player in Dave Rennie's Barbarian F.C.'s squad to play Samoa in Twickenham Stadium in November 2021, though the game did not take place due to COVID-19 cases in the Barbarian's camp.

In March 2022 Dunne signed with the Exeter Chiefs for the 2022–23 season.

Personal life
Dunne is bisexual, having been out as such since his teens, but hadn't talked about it in the media until June 2021.

References

External links
Leinster Academy Profile
Pro14 Profile

1998 births
Bisexual men
Bisexual sportspeople
Dublin University Football Club players
Irish rugby union players
Leinster Rugby players
LGBT rugby union players
Irish LGBT sportspeople
Living people
People educated at St Michael's College, Dublin
Rugby union players from County Dublin
Rugby union locks
Alumni of Trinity College Dublin
Rugby union players from London